George Kapiniaris is an Australian stage, television and film actor and comedian. He is of Greek descent and is best known for his role in popular sitcom Acropolis Now and composed the series' theme song.

Professional background

Theatre work 

Kapiniaris appeared in the stage show Wogs Out of Work with Nick Giannopoulos, in the 1980s. In 2007, he joined forces with fellow comedians Joe Avati, Nish Selvadurai and Simon Palomares for a national tour Il Dago.  In late 2012, he played in the Australian stage version of Chitty Chitty Bang Bang.

Television
In 1987, Kapiniaris joined the cast of the drama series The Flying Doctors as Demetris "D.J." Goannidis. He stayed on this role until 1991. During this time, he also starred in the Melbourne-based popular sitcom Acropolis Now with Giannopoulos, Simon Palomares and Mary Coustas. Since that show's cancellation, he has continued stand-up comedy and has produced a few stage performances, as well as emceeing events such as weddings. Some of his songs include a parody of Knockin' on Heaven's Door, called "Gnocchi on Heaven's Door".

In 2007, Kapiniaris starred in the television comedy series Kick on SBS as Takis Mavros. He also appeared in the same year on the television soap opera Neighbours, in a guest role as a celebrity chef. Kapiniaris appeared in the controversial 2008 mini series Underbelly, where he played a real life character George Defteros. Also in 2008, Kapiniaris (and his Acropolis Now co-star Simon Palomares) made consecutive appearances on successful Channel 31 show, the Deakin TV produced TheatreGames LIVE.

Kapinaris has also had minor stints in Paul Fenech comedies, such as Pizza as an Albanian war criminal, Swift and Shift Couriers as a marriage celebrant and the 2011 comedy Housos in a minor role.

Kapiniaris has appeared in a series of comedic commercials for South Australian automotive repairer and insurance broker, the RAA, featuring Kapiniaris talking to a confidante; a barista named 'Trev' at a coffee shop. Kapiniaris created his own website based on the RAA ads. He also created a satirical Today Tonight segment entitled The Dummies, poking fun at politicians through the use of puppets.

Film
In 2003, he had a role in the film Fat Pizza, playing the character of Ronnie McDoggle. In 2012, he had a minor role in Housos vs Authority, the screen version of the sitcom Housos.

In 2009, he appeared as Ricardo in Broken Hill, an inmate who played guitar in a jail band.

He plays Uncle Taso in the hit Australian stage play which has turned into a big screen sensation, written by Alex Lykos, Alex & Eve 2015.

References

External links

 
 
 

Australian male stage actors
Australian stand-up comedians
Australian male television actors
Australian people of Greek descent
Living people
1961 births